Pallivasal  is a village in Idukki district in the Indian state of Kerala. 

The first hydro-electric project in Kerala was established at Pallivasal during the reign of Maharajah Sree Chithira Thirunal Balarama Varma.

Pallivasal project
The Pallivasal electric project was commissioned in 1940. The Kerala electricity transmission system also emerged in 1940 with a 66 kV line from Pallivasal to Thiruvananthapuram. Eight substations were commissioned in 1940.

Demographics
As of 2011 Census, Pallivasal had population of 10,875 which constitutes 5,417 males and 5,458 females. The average sex ratio was 1007 lower than state average of 1084. In Pallivasal, 9.4% of the population was under 6 years of age. Pallivasal had an average literacy of 90.6% higher than the national average of 74% and lower than state average of 94% ; male literacy was 94.5% and female literacy was 86.8%.

References

External links
www.pallivasal.org

Villages in Idukki district